The 1990 Yugoslav Open was a men's tennis tournament played on outdoor clay courts in Umag, Croatia that was part of the World Series (Designated Week) of the 1990 ATP Tour. It was the first edition of the tournament and was held from 14 May until 20 May 1990. No.1 seed Goran Prpić won the singles title.

Finals

Singles

 Goran Prpić defeated  Goran Ivanišević, 6–3, 4–6, 6-4
 It was Prpić's only ATP singles title of his career.

Doubles

 Vojtěch Flégl /  Daniel Vacek defeated  Andrei Cherkasov /  Andrei Olhovskiy, 6–4, 6–4

References

External links

Croatia Open Umag
Croatia Open
1990 in tennis